James Whitman McLamore (May 30, 1926 – August 8, 1996)  was an American entrepreneur, the founder and first CEO of the Burger King fast food franchise, along with David Edgerton. He also created the Whopper sandwich. After selling Burger King to the Pillsbury Company in 1967, he remained CEO for 5 years. After retiring, he served on the board of several large corporations, was Chairman of the University of Miami, chaired the United Way and was a member and Chairman of the Orange Bowl Committee.  He invested in the Miami Dolphins for several years and reinvested in the educational institutions that impacted him at Northfield Mount Hermon and Cornell University.  He was also a gardener, and Chairman at Fairchild Tropical Gardens.

Early life
McLamore was born in 1926 in New York City. After the Stock Market crash of 1929, his father moved them to the country to his grandmother's. He lost his mother soon after and his family struggled during that time. McLamore went to Northfield Mount Hermon School before attending Cornell University at the School of Hotel Management. He arrived at Cornell with only $11 in his pocket but graduated in 1947. During his time at Cornell, he served in the United States Navy and was a member of the New York Alpha Chapter of the Phi Delta Theta fraternity. Upon graduating from Cornell, McLamore married Nancy Nichol of Miami, Florida.

McLamore's first job in the restaurant business was at a YMCA cafeteria in Wilmington, Delaware before branching out to start his 24/7 fast service restaurant, the Colonial Inn. He left and started a third concept in Miami, Florida called the Brickell Bridge Restaurant in downtown at 550 Brickell Avenue.

Careers

Edgerton originally opened Insta Burger King in Miami, Florida on March 1, 1954. Three months later, on June 1, he met McLamore and they formed the Burger King Corporation. The corporation opened Burger King stores and went on to introduce the Whopper burger in 1957, when it also dropped "Insta" from the name. At this same time, Edgerton, frustrated with the issue-prone Insta machines, created the flame broiler that would provide the signature for Burger King.

In 1961, McLamore negotiated the national rights to Burger King and began growth across the country. McLamore and Edgerton created two supporting businesses in 1962: Distron and Davmor Industries. Distron became the food distribution center for all the stores. Davmor Industries was the manufacturing plant that produced all kitchen equipment for each new store.

Burger King was expanding, but as McDonald's went public in 1965, organic growth became difficult in keeping up. The pair sold the 274 store business to Pillsbury in 1967 in an attempt to grow under the brand. McLamore served as Burger King's CEO until 1972, when he stepped down as Pillsbury was taking the business in a different direction. He remained chairman of the company until 1976.

Retirement and death
After his early retirement, McLamore, with four other businessmen, invested in the Miami Dolphins in the early 1970s from Joe Robbie that led to their resurgence under Don Shula. In 1980, he was elected as Chairman of the University of Miami and worked with Tad Foote to fund raise the third largest campaign to date, resulting in $517.5 million raised for the university. He pursued his passion in gardening, both at home and with Fairchild Tropical Botanic Garden. After Hurricane Andrew destroyed much of Miami, he helped raise $5 million to rebuild the gardens.

In 1988, Grand Metropolitan bought Pillsbury in a hostile takeover. In the early 1990s, McLamore was asked by Jim Adamson, then CEO of Burger King, to come back to support the company with his advice and consulting, particularly with the Franchise community. He returned and gave speeches at the National Franchisee Association conference's in San Francisco and Orlando.

While re-engaging with Burger King, Jim wrote his autobiography, The Burger King: Jim McLamore and The Building of an Empire published by McGraw Hill posthumously in 1998. The book was later edited and republished as The Burger King: A Whopper of a Story on Life and Leadership by the McLamore Family in 2020.

McLamore died of cancer in Coral Gables, Florida, on August 8, 1996, at the age of 70.

Appointments and leadership positions
McLamore's retirement was spent serving on a variety of boards and organizations to support south Florida and the nation as a whole.
 Member: The Florida Council of 100, 1986-1996  
 Chairman: University of Miami Board of Trustees, 1980-1990 
 Member: University of Miami Board of Trustees, 1973-1996 
 President: The Two Hundred Club of Greater Miami, 1979  
 Chairman: Board of Directors, Community Television Foundation of South Florida, Inc., WPBT/Channel 2, 1978-1979 
 President: National Restaurant Association, President 1975-1976 
 Chairman: General Campaign, United Way of Dade County, 1974 
 Chairman: General Campaign, Heart Association of Greater Miami, 1970-1971 
 Member: Board of Trustees, Northfield Mount Hermon School, 1968-1979 
 President: Florida Restaurant Association, 1964 
 Member: YPO - Young Presidents Organization 1963-67  
 Member: Lennar Board of Directors 
 Member: Ryder Board of Directors

References

1926 births
1996 deaths
Burger King people
Cornell University School of Hotel Administration alumni
Fast-food chain founders
20th-century American businesspeople
Northfield Mount Hermon School alumni
Deaths from cancer in Florida